The Fresno State–San Diego State football rivalry is an American college football rivalry between the Fresno State Bulldogs football team of California State University, Fresno and San Diego State Aztecs football team of San Diego State University. Both schools are members of the Mountain West Conference. The winner of the game receives the "Old Oil Can" trophy.

History
The rivalry dates back to 1923 when the two teams competed in the Southern California Junior College Conference. The Aztecs won 12–2 at home. Since then, the sides have met 52 more times, including every year from 1945 to 1979, when the two competed in the same conference or were independents. After not facing one another between 1979 and 1991, the schools resumed the annual series from 1992 to 1998, when both were members of the Western Athletic Conference. In 1999 the Aztecs were one of eight teams that left the WAC to form the Mountain West Conference (MW), which put the rivalry on hold. The two teams however met in 2002 in Fresno. The Bulldogs defeated the Aztecs in a close game 16–14. The rivalry was stalled once again until the two teams met in 2011. The game resulted in an Aztec win 35–28. In 2012, the Bulldogs joined the MW, which renewed the rivalry once again. When the MW expanded to 12 football members and split into divisions for that sport in 2013, the Aztecs and Bulldogs were placed in the new West Division, ensuring annual games for the foreseeable future. San Diego State leads the series 30–27–4, including a 16–13–2 mark in San Diego, a 14–13–2 mark in Fresno and losing the only meeting in Carson.

Oil Can
The Oil Can trophy comes from a 1930s-era oil can hailing from Fresno that was found at a construction site at San Diego State. "The oil can likely came from a time when Aztec and Bulldog fans traveled to football games between the two schools via the old, twisting, precipitous Grapevine section of Highway 99 over Tejon Pass," said Jacquelyn K. Glasener, executive director of the Fresno State Alumni Association. "Cars in those days carried extra oil and water to be sure they could make it through difficult trips," added Jim Herrick, executive director of the San Diego State Alumni Association. The two alumni associations made the oil can into a trophy and the teams started competing for it during the 2011 season.

Game results

See also  
 List of NCAA college football rivalry games

References

College football rivalries in the United States
Fresno State Bulldogs football
San Diego State Aztecs football
1923 establishments in California